The 2004 Hong Kong Sevens was an international rugby sevens tournament that took place at the Hong Kong Stadium between 26–28 March 2004. It was the 29th edition of the Hong Kong Sevens and was the fifth tournament of the 2003–04 World Sevens Series. Twenty-four teams competed in the tournament and were separated into six groups of four with the top eight teams qualifying through to the cup tournament.

After winning all three of their group stage matches, England took out the Hong Kong title for the third year running, defeating Argentina in the cup final 22–12. The plate-final saw Scotland defeat France while the Cook Islands took home the bowl defeating Japan.

Teams
Compared to other tournament of the series, the Hong Kong Sevens had 24 teams compete for the title instead of the regular sixteen teams that usually competed in a World Series event.

Format
The teams were drawn into six pools of four teams each. Each team played the other teams in their pool once, with three points awarded for a win, two points for a draw, and one point for a loss (no points awarded for a forfeit). The pool stage was played over the first two days of the tournament. The top team from each pool along with the two best runners-up advanced to the Cup quarter finals. The remaining four runners-up along with the four best third-placed teams advanced to the Plate quarter finals. The remaining eight teams went on to the Bowl quarter finals.

Pool stage

Pool A

Pool B

Pool C

Pool D

Pool E

Pool F

Knockout stage

Bowl

Source:

Plate

Source:

Cup

Source:

Tournament placings

Source: Rugby7.com

References

Hong Kong Sevens
Hong Kong Sevens
Hong Kong Sevens
Hong Kong Sevens